Tsukuba Capio is an arena in Tsukuba, Ibaraki, Japan. It is the former home arena of the Cyberdyne Ibaraki Robots of the B.League, Japan's professional basketball league.

References

External links
Tsukuba Capio

Basketball venues in Japan

Cyberdyne Ibaraki Robots
Indoor arenas in Japan

Sports venues in Ibaraki Prefecture
Tsukuba, Ibaraki